Mayfield is a locality in the Queanbeyan–Palerang Regional Council, New South Wales, Australia. It is located about 85 km east of Canberra and 58 km south of Goulburn. It had an Anglican church, St Luke's from 1895 to 1965. A "half-time" school was located at Virginia station in Mayfield from 1894 to 1899.

Heritage listings
Mayfield has a number of heritage-listed sites, including:
 Charleyong Road: Virginia

References

Localities in New South Wales
Queanbeyan–Palerang Regional Council
Southern Tablelands